One-T is a French animated band created in 2000 by Eddy Gronfier and Thomas Pieds. Eddy Gronfier produces the music while Thomas Pieds creates the artwork and visuals. They were successful across Europe, especially France and Germany, with their 2003 hit single "The Magic Key", but since then were not able to repeat that success and remained a One-hit wonder.

The Concept
One-T is composed of several characters:

One-T (main character): A 13-year-old boy who abuses drugs and insults his new-age parents. Despite his young age, he dreams of becoming a DJ and wants to unite all teenagers around the world against the war in Iraq, and continue to produce his influences in different languages.

Nine-T: A young Latino and best friend of One-T. He organizes events in his father's bar.

Fat-T: A fat Latino MC, who appeared in "Hamburguesa".

E: A gifted Japanese computer hacker. He lives with his twin sister Ee and never goes outside.

Ee: The twin sister of E. Her personality is the complete opposite of E's.

Cool-T: Another friend of One-T, but of African descent. At the end of the "Music is the One-T ODC" music video, he gets shot by Travoltino, which is the subject of "The Magic Key". Later he is kicked out of heaven, and returns to Earth.

Bull-T: One-T's pet dog. Bull-T was genetically manipulated to never bark loudly or be mean.

The enemies of One-T:

Travoltino: A mobster and television personality. He owns a record company, a TV channel, a newspaper, and a nightclub, where it is difficult to enter without being "jet-set." He is the enemy of One-T, and is the one who shot Cool-T.

Acidman: An inventor and dealer of his own drugs. His work is funded by Travoltino. Acidman is currently wanted by the police.

History

One-T made their first appearance in France during the summer of 2001, with the release of the hit single "Music Is The One-T ODC". The single was a success and was ranked the 82nd best-selling single over the year of 2001. It was followed shortly by the single "Bein' a Star".

One-T returned to the dance music scene in the summer of 2003 with their single "The Magic Key", which introduced One-T's best friend, Cool-T, as the rap singer in the song. The title reached 9th place of the single charts and was ranked the 22nd best-selling single for 2003. "The Magic Key" was also well received in Germany, Poland and Austria, where it reached 5th place of the single charts, and Denmark, where it reached 4th place. Their first full-length album, The One-T ODC, was released in July 2003.

Several singles followed over the years, including the theme song for Starsky & Hutch, and Kamasutra, released in early 2005. However, none of them were very successful, and they remained a one-hit wonder in most parts of Europe.

One-T's second studio album, The One-T's ABC, was released in early 2006 as a digital album, and was available only on a few legal downloading sites, such as iTunes. In 2007, the album was released physically and garnered much success in France and the rest of Europe. Since then, no new albums and singles were released and not much was heard of the project afterwards, thus making it unclear if it is still active and if further material will be released.

In honor of the 20th anniversary of the musical group One-T, in July 2022 album The One-T ODC was remastered. Also, A music video for the remastered song was released The Magic Key, The Magic Key 2, together with Boogie Fre$h

The Creators

The cartoon characters in this band were created to conceal the real people behind this project. The people behind this project are Eddy Gronfier, responsible for the musical part of the project, is a former radio host (on NRJ, Fun Radio, Maxximum, M40 Rock ....), jingle producer (on RTL, Skyrock, M40, Radio Scoop ...), radio director (The monsters on Skyrock, Charly and Lulu on RTL 2 ...), and composer/ remixer of One-T, and Thomas Pieds, author of the concept and the song lyrics, is also the director of the One-T music videos. Before One-T, Thomas was already directing music videos, TV ads and TV series.

Discography

Albums

Singles

References

External links
 One-T on Myspace

French hip hop groups
French electronic music groups
Animated musical groups
Musical groups established in 2001